The Far Frontier  is a 1948 American Western film starring Roy Rogers.

Plot 
Tom Sharper of the border patrol stops a truck to inspect its cargo. He is knocked cold by the drivers, who report back to their boss, Bart Carroll.

Coming from a cattle drive, rancher Roy Rogers hopes to visit his old friend Tom, but he's not there. Tom's dad is a former marshal who has tangled before with store owner Willis Newcomb, who is masterminding a scheme to transport U.S. criminal fugitives from Mexico prisons across the border.

Tom has amnesia. Bart decides to frame Tom by shooting a rancher with Tom's gun.  He becomes the object of a manhunt, but Roy finds him first and is able to restore Tom's memory. Together, they fight Bart and Newcomb, and after it appears Tom has been killed by going over a cliff in a barrel, Roy saves the day and discovers that Tom is safe.

Cast 
 Roy Rogers as Roy
 Clayton Moore as Tom
 Gail Davis as Susan
 Andy Devine as Cookie
 Roy Barcroft as Bart
 Robert Strange as Newcomb

External links 
 

1948 films
1948 Western (genre) films
Republic Pictures films
American Western (genre) films
Trucolor films
Films directed by William Witney
1940s English-language films
1940s American films